Positivity is an album by the British acid jazz band Incognito, released in 1993.

The album peaked at No. 55 on the UK Albums Chart. It has sold more than 350,000 copies in the United States.

Production
The album was produced by band leader Jean-Paul "Bluey" Maunick. In constructing the album, Maunick was chiefly inspired by Stevie Wonder's Talking Book and Innervisions.

Critical reception

The Washington Post wrote that "the band mines familiar funk grooves with more than enough imagination and horn power to keep things fresh." The Calgary Herald praised the "free flowing numbers that eschew harder edge riffs for music suited more for spliffs." USA Today stated that "the commercially oriented backbeats and vocals (more singing than on their previous two albums) are counterbalanced by a tight horn section and jazzy, crisp arrangements." The Orange County Register opined that "the strength lies in vocalists Maysa Leak and Mark Anthoni, whose rich-sounding voices glide through each track as easily as a hot spoon through ice cream."

AllMusic wrote that "group leader Jean-Paul 'Bluey' Maunick's vision of intertwine various genres of music (bebop, soul, classical, dance, etc.) into one incomparable sound is exemplary." MusicHound R&B: The Essential Album Guide called "Deep Waters" a "landmark acid-jazz track."

Track listing

References

1993 albums